Henrich "Heini" Walter (28 July 1927 – 12 May 2009) was a Swiss racing driver. He participated in one Formula One World Championship Grand Prix, on 5 August 1962. He finished 14th, scoring no World Championship points. He also participated in non-Championship Formula One races.

Complete Formula One World Championship results
(key)

References

External links 
 Tribute to Heini Walter

1927 births
2009 deaths
24 Hours of Le Mans drivers
Swiss Formula One drivers
Scuderia Filipinetti Formula One drivers
Swiss racing drivers
World Sportscar Championship drivers